Margaret Beznak (1914 – January 21, 1999) was a Hungarian-born Canadian medical researcher and chair of the physiology department at the University of Ottawa.

Early life
Margaret Hortobagyi was born in Hungary, the daughter of Béla and Margaret Hortobagyi. Both of her parents were medical doctors; her father was chief of surgery at a hospital in Budapest. Her brother also became a doctor.

Margaret Hortobagyi studied medicine at the University of Budapest, earning her medical degree in 1939.

Career
Margaret Beznak and her husband were physiologists in Budapest until the left in 1948. They first went to Stockholm, and then to Birmingham, England, where she had a grant for her research from the Medical Research Council of Great Britain. Beznak's research focused on the causes of heart disease.

The Beznaks relocated to Ottawa in 1953, and Margaret joined the staff at the University of Ottawa soon after. She became an assistant professor there in 1956. When Aladar Beznak died in 1959, she was appointed to succeed him as department head in physiology.

Beznak also held the post of Vice Dean at the university, and represented the medical school faculty in the faculty senate. In 1968, she was the first woman elected to serve on the university's Board of Governors.

In 1970, she was succeeded as department chair by another Hungarian-trained physiologist, Geza Hetenyi.

Personal life
Margaret married Aladar B. L. Beznak, a fellow physiologist, in Hungary. The couple left Hungary in 1948, on foot, with only one bag of belongings. She was widowed when he died in 1959. 

Margaret Beznak died in 1999, after years with Alzheimer's disease.

References

1914 births
1999 deaths
Academic staff of the University of Ottawa
Canadian physiologists
Hungarian emigrants to Canada